Adrienne Monson (born July 27, 1983) is an American writer.

Biography
A Utah native, Monson currently resides in American Fork, Utah.  She was the winner of 2009 Oquirrh Writers contest  and placed in the 2010 Utah RWA's Great Beginnings contest.

Monson was married in 2005, and has two children. She is writing book three in the Blood Inheritance Trilogy.

Writing
Monson published her first novel, Dissension, through Jolly Fish Press on February 23, 2013, to generally positive reviews. Dissension tells the story about Leisha, who was once a loving mother with an ideal family. Though this was over two thousand years ago, Leisha still holds that time dear to her heart. But for now, she must focus on trying to escape the eternal and bloody war between her kind—the Vampires—and the Immortals, an undying race sworn to destroy her people. Soon, Leisha finds herself captured by the government only to be saved by a young and mysterious human girl. What entails is the beginning of a long and torturous journey as Leisha and her newfound friend run for their lives while searching for the one thing that can end it all—the prophecy child.

This is book one in The Blood Inheritance Trilogy.

Selected works
 Dissension (2013)

Short works
 Convoluted (2012)
 Death by Proxy (2012)

References

External links

Monson's personal website
Forbes Quote - Forbes Quote
MSN Quote

1983 births
21st-century American novelists
American fantasy writers
American paranormal romance writers
American Latter Day Saints
American women novelists
Living people
Novelists from Utah
Women science fiction and fantasy writers
People from American Fork, Utah
Women romantic fiction writers
21st-century American women writers